Amor Mío is a 1997 Venezuelan telenovela that was seen and broadcast on Venevisión. The telenovela was written by Isamar Hernández and Tabare Perez. Astrid Gruber and Julio Pereira starred as the main protagonists.

Cast
Astrid Gruber as Amada Briceño / Veronica
Julio Pereira as Luis Fernando Alcantara
Félix Loreto as Mariano Fonseca
Gabriel Fernández as Ricardo Sifuentes
Nury Flores as Doña Enriqueta Alcantara
Isabel Moreno as Carmen de Briceño
Haydee Balza as Amalia de Sifuentes
Mirtha Borges as Mercedes
Judith Vasquez
Juan Frankis as Juan
Eliseo Perera as Felipe
Bettina Grand as Ligia Sifuentes
Elena Dinisio as Leticia Alcantara
Roberto Colmenares
Carlos Omaña  as Vicente Briceño
Aura Rivas as Chichita
Marco A. Casanova as Andres Fonseca
Winda Pierralt
Asdrubal Blanco

References

External links
Amor mío at the Internet Movie Database
Amor mio entrada (From Venezuela) at YouTube

1997 telenovelas
Venevisión telenovelas
1997 Venezuelan television series debuts
1997 Venezuelan television series endings
Venezuelan telenovelas
Spanish-language telenovelas
Television shows set in Caracas